In mathematics, especially functional analysis, a Fréchet algebra, named after Maurice René Fréchet, is an associative algebra  over the real or complex numbers that at the same time is also a (locally convex) Fréchet space.
If  is an increasing family of seminorms for
Fréchet algebras are also called B0-algebras.

In that case, by rescaling the seminorms, we may also take  for each  and the seminorms are said to be submultiplicative:  for all  -convex Fréchet algebras may also be called Fréchet algebras.

A Fréchet algebra may or may not have an identity element . If  is unital, we do not require that  as is often done for Banach algebras.

Properties
 Continuity of multiplication. Multiplication is jointly continuous if  and  imply . Joint continuity of multiplication is part of the definition of a Fréchet algebra. For a Fréchet space with an algebra structure, if the multiplication is separately continuous, then it is automatically jointly continuous.
 Group of invertible elements. Unlike for Banach algebras,  may not be an open set. If  is open, then  is called a -algebra.
 Conditions for -convexity. A commutative Fréchet -algebra is -convex, but there exist examples of non-commutative Fréchet -algebras which are not -convex.
 Properties of -convex Fréchet algebras. A Fréchet algebra is -convex if and only if it is a countable projective limit of Banach algebras.

Examples
 Zero multiplication. If  is any Fréchet space, we can make a Fréchet algebra structure by setting  for all .
 Smooth functions on the circle. Let  be the 1-sphere. This is a 1-dimensional compact differentiable manifold, with no boundary. This is clearly an algebra over the complex numbers, for pointwise multiplication. (Use the product rule for differentiation.) It is commutative, and the constant function  acts as an identity.
Let  be the space of complex-valued sequences on the natural numbers .
 Convolution algebra of rapidly vanishing functions on a finitely generated discrete group. Let  be a finitely generated group, with the discrete topology.
 Non -convex Fréchet algebras. The Aren's algebra  is an example of a commutative non--convex Fréchet algebra with discontinuous inversion.

Generalizations
We can drop the requirement for the algebra to be locally convex, but still a complete metric space. In this case, the underlying space may be called a Fréchet space or an F-space.

If the requirement that the number of seminorms be countable is dropped, the algebra becomes locally convex (LC) or locally multiplicatively convex (LMC). A complete LMC algebra is called an Arens-Michael algebra.

Open problems
Perhaps the most famous, still open problem of the theory of topological algebras is whether all linear multiplicative functionals on an -convex Frechet algebra are continuous. The statement that this be the case is known as Michael's Conjecture.

Notes

Citations

Sources